Chisindia is a commune in Arad County, Romania.Chisindia lies in the southern part of the Sebiș Basin, at the foot of the Cuedului Hills, and it has a surface of 12928 ha. It is composed of three villages: Chisindia (situated at 92 km from Arad), Păiușeni (Pajzs) and Văsoaia (Vészalja).

Population
According to the last census, the population of the commune counts 1580 inhabitants, out of which 98.2% are Romanians, 0.1% Hungarians, 1.5% Roms and 0.2% are of other or undeclared nationalities.

History
The first documentary record of the locality Chisindia dates back to 1349. Păiușeni was mentioned in documents in 1574, while Văsoaia in 1574.

Economy
The economy of the commune is mainly agricultural, both component sectors are well-developed.

References

Communes in Arad County
Localities in Crișana